"You Make Me Feel So Free" is a song written by Irish singer-songwriter Van Morrison and recorded on his 1979 album, Into the Music.

Biographer Johnny Rogan writes about the song "It seems that the surer the singer is of his message, the clearer is his enunciation, and that he is more prone to chew on his words when he is less confident in the song itself. This seems true of "You Make Me Feel So Free", though the message of the title seems clear enough. There are musical compensations in David Hayes' bubbling bass and Pee Wee Ellis' saxophone solo."

Appearance on other albums
A live version was included on his 1994 album, A Night in San Francisco.

Personnel on original release
Van Morrison: vocals
Herbie Armstrong: guitar
Pee Wee Ellis: tenor saxophone
David Hayes: bass guitar
Mark Isham: trumpet
Mark Jordan: piano
Katie Kissoon: backing vocals
Peter Van Hooke: drums

Covers
Sinéad O'Connor performed the song on the Van Morrison tribute album No Prima Donna: The Songs of Van Morrison.

Notes

References
Rogan, Johnny (2006). Van Morrison: No Surrender, London: Vintage Books 

Van Morrison songs
1979 songs
1980 singles
Songs written by Van Morrison
Warner Records singles
Song recordings produced by Van Morrison